In Greek mythology, Eros is the Greek god of love and sex. His Roman counterpart was Cupid ("desire"). In the earliest account, he is a primordial god, while in later accounts he is described as one of the children of Aphrodite and Ares and, with some of his siblings, was one of the Erotes, a group of winged love gods.

He is usually presented as a handsome young man, though in some appearances he is a juvenile boy full of mischief, ever in the company of his mother. In both cases, he is winged and carries his signature bow and arrows, which he uses to make both mortals and immortal gods fall in love, usually under the guidance of Aphrodite. His role in myths is mostly complementary; he often appears in the presence of Aphrodite and the other love gods and often acts as a catalyst for people to fall in love, but has little unique mythology of his own; the most major exception to that being the myth of Eros and Psyche, the story of how he met and fell in love with his wife.

Eros, or rather his Roman equivalent Cupid, remained popular during the Middle Ages and the Renaissance. His iconography and role influenced the depiction of Cupid, in addition to Christian tradition. This iteration Eros/Cupid became a major icon and symbol of Valentine's Day.

Etymology
The Greek , meaning 'desire', comes from  'to desire, love', of uncertain etymology. R. S. P. Beekes has suggested a Pre-Greek origin.

Cult and depiction 
Eros appears in ancient Greek sources under several different guises. In the earliest sources (the cosmogonies, the earliest philosophers, and texts referring to the mystery religions), he is one of the primordial gods involved in the coming into being of the cosmos. In later sources, however, Eros is represented as the son of Aphrodite, whose mischievous interventions in the affairs of gods and mortals cause bonds of love to form, often illicitly. Ultimately, in the later satirical poets, he is represented as a blindfolded child, the precursor to the chubby Renaissance Cupid, whereas in early Greek poetry and art, Eros was depicted as a young adult male who embodies sexual power, and a profound artist.

A cult of Eros existed in pre-classical Greece, but it was much less important than that of Aphrodite. However, in late antiquity, Eros was worshiped by a fertility cult in Thespiae. In Athens, he shared a very popular cult with Aphrodite, and the fourth day of every month was sacred to him (also shared by Herakles, Hermes and Aphrodite).

Eros was one of the Erotes, along with other figures such as Himeros and Pothos, who are sometimes considered patrons of homosexual love between males. Eros is also part of a triad of gods that played roles in homoerotic relationships, along with Heracles and Hermes, who bestowed qualities of beauty (and loyalty), strength, and eloquence, respectively, onto male lovers.

The Thespians celebrated the Erotidia meaning festivals of Eros.

He had the epithet Klêidouchos (Κλειδοῦχος), meaning holding/bearing the keys, because he was holding the key to hearts.

Mythology

Primordial god
According to Hesiod's Theogony (c. 700 BC), one of the most ancient of all Greek sources, Eros (the god of love) was the fourth god to come into existence, coming after Chaos, Gaia (the Earth), and Tartarus (the abyss).

Homer does not mention Eros. However, Parmenides (c. 400 BC), one of the pre-Socratic philosophers, makes Eros the first of all the gods to come into existence.

The Orphic and Eleusinian Mysteries featured Eros as a very original god, but not quite primordial, since he was the child of Night (Nyx). Aristophanes (c. 400 BC), influenced by Orphism, relates the birth of Eros:

At the beginning there was only Chaos, Night, dark Erebus, and deep Tartarus. Earth, the air and heaven had no existence. Firstly, blackwinged Night laid a germless egg in the bosom of the infinite deeps of Erebus, and from this, after the revolution of long ages, sprang the graceful Eros with his glittering golden wings, swift as the whirlwinds of the tempest. He mated in deep Tartarus with dark Chaos, winged like himself, and thus hatched forth our race, which was the first to see the light.

In some versions the Orphic Egg which contains Eros is created by Chronos, and it is Eros who bore Nyx as his daughter and took her as his consort. Eros was called "Protogonos" meaning "first-born" because he was the first of the immortals that could be conceived by man, and was thought of as the creator of all other beings and the first ruler of the universe. Nyx bore to Eros the gods Gaia and Ouranos. Eros passes his scepter of power to Nyx, who then passes it to Ouranos. The primordial Eros was also called Phanes ('illuminated one'), Erikepaios ('power'), Metis ('thought') and Dionysus. Zeus was said to have swallowed Phanes (Eros), and absorbing his powers of creation remade the world anew, such that Zeus was then both creator and ruler of the universe. The Orphics also thought that Dionysus was an incarnation of the primordial Eros, and that Zeus (the modern ruler) passed the scepter of power to Dionysus. Thus Eros was the first ruler of the universe, and as Dionysus he regained the scepter of power once again.

Son of Aphrodite and Ares 
In later myths, he was the son of the deities Aphrodite and Ares: it is the Eros of these later myths who is one of the erotes. Eros was depicted as often carrying a lyre or bow and arrow.  He was also depicted accompanied by dolphins, flutes, roosters, roses, and torches.

 [Hera addresses Athena:]
 “We must have a word with Aphrodite. Let us go together and ask her to persuade her boy [Eros], if that is possible, to loose an arrow at Aeetes’ daughter, Medea of the many spells, and make her fall in love with Jason ...” (Argonautica)

 “He [Eros] smites maids’ breasts with unknown heat, and bids the very gods leave heaven and dwell on earth in borrowed forms.” (Phaedra)
 “Once, when Venus’ son [Eros] was kissing her, his quiver dangling down, a jutting arrow, unbeknown, had grazed her breast. She pushed the boy away. In fact the wound was deeper than it seemed, though unperceived at first. [And she became] enraptured by the beauty of a man [Adonis].” (Metamorphoses)
 “Eros drove Dionysos mad for the girl [Aura] with the delicious wound of his arrow, then curving his wings flew lightly to Olympus. And the god roamed over the hills scourged with a greater fire.” (Dionysiaca)

Eros and Psyche 

The story of Eros and Psyche has a longstanding tradition as a folktale of the ancient Greco-Roman world long before it was committed to literature in Apuleius' Latin novel, The Golden Ass. The novel itself is written in a picaresque Roman style, yet Psyche retains her Greek name even though Eros and Aphrodite are called by their Latin names (Cupid and Venus). Also, Cupid is depicted as a young adult, rather than a fat winged child.

The story tells of the quest for love and trust between Eros and Psyche. Aphrodite was jealous of the beauty of mortal princess Psyche, as men were leaving her altars barren to worship a mere human woman instead, and so she commanded her son Eros, the god of love, to cause Psyche to fall in love with the ugliest creature on earth. But instead, Eros falls in love with Psyche himself and spirits her away to his home. Their fragile peace is ruined by a visit from Psyche's jealous sisters, who cause Psyche to betray the trust of her husband. Wounded, Eros leaves his wife, and Psyche wanders the Earth, looking for her lost love. Eventually, she approaches Aphrodite and asks for her help. Aphrodite imposes a series of difficult tasks on Psyche, which she is able to achieve by means of supernatural assistance.

After successfully completing these tasks, Aphrodite relents and Psyche becomes immortal to live alongside her husband Eros. Together they had a daughter, Voluptas or Hedone (meaning physical pleasure, bliss).

In Greek mythology, Psyche was the deification of the human soul. She was portrayed in ancient mosaics as a goddess with butterfly wings (because psyche was also the Ancient Greek word for "butterfly"). The Greek word psyche literally means "soul, spirit, breath, life, or animating force".

In the Gnostic narrative found in On the Origin of the World, Eros, during the universe's creation, is scattered in all the creatures of Chaos, existing between the midpoint of light and darkness as well as the angels and people. Later, Psyche pours her blood upon him, causing the first rose to sprout up on the Earth, followed by every flower and herb.

Dionysiaca 
Eros features in two Dionysus-related myths. In the first, Eros made Hymnus, a young shepherd, to fall in love with the beautiful Naiad Nicaea. Nicaea never reciprocated Hymnus' affection, and he in desperation asked her to kill him. She fulfilled his wish, but Eros, disgusted with Nicaea's actions, made Dionysus fall in love with her by hitting him with a love arrow. Nicaea rejected Dionysus, so he filled the spring she used to drink from with wine. Intoxicated, Nicaea lay to rest as Dionysus forced himself on her. Afterwards, she sought to find him seeking revenge, but never found him. In the other, one of Artemis' maiden nymphs Aura boasted of being better than her mistress, due to having a virgin's body, as opposed to Artemis' sensuous and lush figure, thereby bringing into question Artemis' virginity. Artemis, angered, asked Nemesis, the goddess of vengeance and retribution, to avenge her, and Nemesis ordered Eros to make Dionysus fall in love with Aura. The tale then continues in the same manner as Nicaea's myth; Dionysus gets Aura drunk and then rapes her.

Other myths 
Eros made two chaste hunting companions of Artemis, Rhodopis and Euthynicus, to fall in love with each other at the behest of his mother Aphrodite, who took offence at them rejecting her domain of love and marriage. Artemis then punished Rhodopis by turning her into a fountain.

In another myth, Eros and Aphrodite played in a meadow, and had a light competition about which would gather the most flowers. Eros was in the lead thanks to his swift wings, but then a nymph named Peristera ("dove") gathered some flowers herself and handed them over to Aphrodite, making her victorious. Eros turned Peristera into a dove.

According to Porphyrius, Themis, the goddess of justice, played a role in Eros growing up. His mother Aphrodite once complained to Themis that Eros did not grow and remained a perpetual child, so Themis advised her to give him a brother. Aphrodite then gave birth to Anteros (meaning "counter-love"), and whenever he was near him, Eros grew. But if Anteros was away, Eros shrank back to his previous, smaller size.

Another time, when Eros had assumed his child-like appearance and tried bending his bow, the god Apollo, who was similarly an archer god as well, mocked him by saying that he should leave the weapons to the older gods, and bragged about his slaying of Python. Eros was angered, so he immediately struck Apollo with a love arrow, making him fall in love with Daphne, a virginal nymph of the woods. In the same fashion he struck Daphne with a lead arrow, which had the opposite effect, and made the nymph be repulsed by Apollo and his ardent wooing. In the end, Daphne would be transformed into a tree in order to escape the god's advances.

Attributes

Bow and arrows 
Eros is imagined as a beautiful youth who carries bow and powerful arrows which he uses to make anyone fall madly in love. Ovid, a Roman author, elaborates on Eros' arsenal and specifies that Eros carries two kinds of arrows; the first are his golden arrows which induce a powerful feeling of love and affection on their target. The second kind are made of lead instead, and have the opposite effect; they make people averse to love, and fill their hearts with hatred. This is mostly utilized in the story of Daphne and Apollo, where Eros made Apollo fall in love with the nymph, and Daphne to detest any forms of romance. Meanwhile, in Ovid's tale of Persephone's abduction by Hades, the abduction is initiated by Aphrodite and Eros; Aphrodite commands Eros to make Hades fall in love with his niece, so that their domain can reach the Underworld. Eros has to use his strongest possible arrow to make Hades's stern heart melt.

In an Anacreon fragment, preserved by Athenaeus, the author laments how Eros struck him with a purple ball, making him fall in love with a woman who is attracted to other women, and shuns him over his white hair.

Eros is characterized as a mighty entity who controls everyone, and even immortals cannot escape. Lucian satirized this concept in his Dialogues of the Gods, where Zeus chides Eros for making him fall in love with and then deceive so many mortal women, and even his mother Aphrodite advises him against using all the gods as his playthings. Nevertheless Eros could not touch any of the virgin goddesses (Hestia, Athena and Artemis) who had all taken a vow of purity. Sappho writes of Artemis that 'limb-loosening Eros never goes near her.'

Eros and the bees 

A repetitive motif in ancient poetry included Eros being stung by bees. The story is first found in the Anacreontea, attributed to sixth century BC author Anacreon, and goes that Eros once went to his mother Aphrodite crying about being stung by a bee, and compared the small creature to a snake with wings. Aphrodite then asks him, if he thinks the bee's sting hurts so much, what he thinks about the pain his own arrows cause.

Theocritus, coming a bit later during the fourth century BC, expanded the anecdote a little in his Idylls. Little Eros is stung by bees when he attempts to steal honey from their beehive. The bees pierce all of his fingers. He runs to his mother crying, and muses how creatures this small and cause pain so big. Aphrodite smiles and compares him to the bees, as he too is small, and causes pain much greater than his size.

This little tale was retold in antiquity and Renaissance many times.

God of friendship and liberty 
Pontianus of Nicomedia, a character in Deipnosophistae by Athenaeus, asserts that Zeno of Citium thought that Eros was the god of friendship and liberty.

Erxias (Ἐρξίας) wrote that the Samians consecrated a gymnasium to Eros. The festival instituted in his honour was called the Eleutheria (Ἐλευθέρια), meaning "liberty".

The Lacedaemonians offered sacrifices to Eros before they went into battle, thinking that safety and victory depend on the friendship of those who stand side by side in the battle. In addition, the Cretans offered sacrifices to Eros in their line of battle.

Eros in music 
Jose Antonio Bottiroli Eros in B minor B37 for piano (1974)

Eros in art

See also 

 Eros (concept)
 Greek words for love
 Kamadeva
 Family tree of the Greek gods
 Phanes (mythology)

Notes

References 

Aristophanes, Birds. The Complete Greek Drama. vol. 2. Eugene O'Neill, Jr. New York. Random House. 1938. Online version at the Perseus Digital Library.
Aristophanes, Aristophanes Comoediae edited by F.W. Hall and W.M. Geldart, vol. 2. F.W. Hall and W.M. Geldart. Oxford. Clarendon Press, Oxford. 1907. Greek text available at the Perseus Digital Library.
 Caldwell, Richard, Hesiod's Theogony, Focus Publishing/R. Pullins Company (June 1, 1987). .
 "Eros." Cassells's Encyclopedia of Queer Myth, Symbol and Spirit Gay, Lesbian, Bisexual and Transgender Lore, 1997.
 Gantz, Timothy, Early Greek Myth: A Guide to Literary and Artistic Sources, Johns Hopkins University Press, 1996, Two volumes:  (Vol. 1),  (Vol. 2).
 Hard, Robin, The Routledge Handbook of Greek Mythology: Based on H.J. Rose's "Handbook of Greek Mythology", Psychology Press, 2004, . Google Books.
 Hesiod, Theogony, in The Homeric Hymns and Homerica with an English Translation by Hugh G. Evelyn-White, Cambridge, Massachusetts, Harvard University Press; London, William Heinemann Ltd. 1914. Online version at the Perseus Digital Library.
Smith, William; Dictionary of Greek and Roman Biography and Mythology, London (1873). "Eros"
 Nonnus, Dionysiaca; translated by Rouse, W H D, I Books I-XV. Loeb Classical Library No. 344, Cambridge, Massachusetts, Harvard University Press; London, William Heinemann Ltd. 1940. Internet Archive
 Nonnus, Dionysiaca; translated by Rouse, W H D, II Books XVI-XXXV. Loeb Classical Library No. 345, Cambridge, Massachusetts, Harvard University Press; London, William Heinemann Ltd. 1940. Internet Archive
 Nonnus, Dionysiaca; translated by Rouse, W H D, III Books XXXVI-XLVIII. Loeb Classical Library No. 346, Cambridge, Massachusetts, Harvard University Press; London, William Heinemann Ltd. 1940. Internet Archive.
 The Greek Anthology. with an English Translation by. W. R. Paton. London. William Heinemann Ltd. 1916. 1. Full text available at topostext.org.

External links 
 
 Warburg Institute Iconographic Database - Amor
 EROS (PRIMORDIAL) from The Theoi Project
 EROS (OLYMPIAN) from The Theoi Project

 
Personifications in Greek mythology
Personifications
Homosexuality and bisexuality deities
Greek love and lust deities
Love and lust gods
Greek primordial deities
Erotes
Greek gods
Mythological Greek archers
Children of Aphrodite
Children of Ares
Metamorphoses characters
LGBT themes in Greek mythology
Avian humanoids
Olympian deities
Children of Nyx